The People's Alliance was a political party in the Maldives. The party was registered by the Election Commission on 4 August 2008 and was dissolved in 2013.

The party's former leader was former trade minister and former president of Maldives Abdulla Yameen, a half brother of former President Maumoon Abdul Gayoom. He resigned in 2010, to join the Progressive Party of Maldives.

References

Social Liberal Party